Ned Zeman (born 1966) is a writer for Vanity Fair magazine and also a screenwriter. He covers Hollywood, crime, politics, and wildlife. He joined Vanity Fair as a senior editor in May 1997. In June 2000, he became a contributing editor. Before working with Vanity Fair, Zeman wrote for a number of magazines which include GQ, Sports Illustrated, and Outside Magazine. Prior, he a staff writer at Newsweek from 1988 to 1993 during which he also wrote for Spy.

Works
He has covered and interviewed celebrities such as Jennifer Lopez, Mike Ovitz, and Julia Roberts.

While reporting a 2001 story about Steven Seagal's links to the mafia, he was threatened by an unknown gunman. Zeman wrote a well known article about the death of Timothy Treadwell, who lived among bears.

In 2011, Zeman published his memoir entitled "The Rules of the Tunnel: My Brief Period of Madness" where he details his battle with clinical depression.

Awards and honors
His article on the death of Timothy Treadwell, was a finalist for the National Magazine Award. This same article was optioned for the movies along with his article on Bruno Zehnder, the man who photographed penguins.

Bibliography

 Manti Te'o

References

1966 births
Living people
American male screenwriters
Vanity Fair (magazine) people
20th-century American journalists
American male journalists
American male non-fiction writers